The women's 75 kg powerlifting event at the 2012 Summer Paralympics was contested on 3 September at ExCeL London.

Records 
Prior to the competition, the existing world and Paralympic records were as follows.

Results 

Key: PR=Paralympic record; WR=World record; NMR=No marks recorded

References 

 

Women's 075 kg
Para